The 1999 season was the Denver Broncos' 30th in the National Football League (NFL) and their 40th overall. The 1999 Broncos were hoping to win a third consecutive Super Bowl, but after winning a second against the Atlanta Falcons in Super Bowl XXXIII in Miami, the team suffered the retirement of Super Bowl XXXIII MVP quarterback John Elway during the off-season. Elway had spent his entire career with the Broncos, and much of the focus in the weeks leading up to the season centered on the void left by Elway's departure. Head coach Mike Shanahan announced that third-round 1998 draft pick Brian Griese, son of Miami Dolphins quarterback Bob Griese, would take the reins of the offense, passing over veteran and credible back-up quarterback Bubby Brister.

In the preseason, the Broncos played in the first and so far only NFL game held in Australia. On August 7, before a crowd of 73,811 spectators at Stadium Australia in Sydney, the Broncos defeated the San Diego Chargers 20–17.

Although no one expected a serious defense of their title, the Broncos would stumble out of the gate this season, losing the first four regular season games. Many of the games would be decided in the final two minutes of play, but the Broncos found themselves on the losing end at 6–10. It was their first losing season since 1994, their worst season since 1990 and the worst record of the five-team AFC West. This was the worst-ever season for a team defending their Super Bowl title in a non-strike season. Only the 1982 San Francisco 49ers had a lower winning percentage as they failed to defend their first Super Bowl championship.

The Broncos and the Atlanta Falcons combined for an 11–21 record in 1999. This is, as of 2019, the worst combined record for both defending conference and/or Super Bowl champions in the season following a Super Bowl appearance. The 11-21 mark was matched by the Tampa Bay Buccaneers and Oakland Raiders four years later, one season removed from Super Bowl XXXVII.

Statistics site Football Outsiders calculates that the Broncos went from the league's third-easiest schedule in 1998, to the hardest schedule in 1999:
 Before 2011, the worst one-year increase in strength of schedule belonged to the 1999 Broncos. Denver had ridden the third-easiest schedule (in a 30-team league) to a Lombardi Trophy in 1998, only to fall apart the next season under the weight of John Elway's retirement, Terrell Davis'[s] Week 4 injury, and – oh, by the way – the toughest schedule in the league.
This was the largest single-season change in Football Outsiders' rankings until the 2011 St. Louis Rams.

Week 4 saw star running back Terrell Davis, who was last year's league MVP, hurt his knee and was placed on injured reserve for the remainder of the season.

Offseason

NFL draft

Draft Notes

Personnel

Staff

Roster

Schedule

Standings

References

External links 
 1999 Denver Broncos at Pro-Football-Reference.com

Denver Broncos
Denver Broncos seasons
Denver Broncos